The Koolhoven F.K.50 was a 1930s Dutch eight-passenger light transport monoplane designed and built by Koolhoven.

Development
The F.K.50 was designed to meet a requirement from the Swiss airline Swiss Alpar for a light transport capable of operating in Switzerland. The F.K.50 was a cantilever high-wing cabin monoplane with a fixed wide track tailwheel landing gear. The fuselage was of welded steel tube construction, covered with fabric. The tailplane was of similar construction. The wings were wooden construction, covered with plywood. It was powered by two Pratt & Whitney Wasp Junior T1B engines and had a conventional single fin and rudder. The first of two aircraft first flew on the 18 September 1935 and the second flew in March 1936.

A third aircraft, designated F.K.50A, was built in 1938 with a re-designed tail unit with twin vertical tail surfaces. It had a longer nose and larger mainwheels, with a higher all-up weight.

Two bomber variants, designated F.K.50B, were proposed but never built. The first was a straight conversion of the F.K.50; the second would have been powered by  Bristol Mercury VIS radial engines. It would have been operated by a crew of four and carried a  bomb load.

Operational history
The three aircraft operated a regular service between Swiss destinations and onwards to Lyons and Marseilles and charter flights to Paris and London.

F.K.50
HB-AMI
The first to be built, the aircraft entered service in October 1935.  During World War II, the aircraft operated weekly between Berne and Croydon, United Kingdom.  The aircraft was scrapped in 1947.

HB-AMO
The second to be built, the aircraft crashed on landing 25 kilometers from Basle Airport on 10 September 1937 with the loss of three lives.

F.K.50A
HB-AMA
The sole F.K.50A, the aircraft was delivered in 1938. It also operated between Berne and Croydon during World War II. In 1947, it was sold to Liberian operator Maryland Flying Services and re-registered EL-ADV, operating with them until 6 July 1962 when it crashed near Monrovia.

Variants
F.K.50
Two built, single vertical tail. The second aircraft had larger engine nacelles than the first.
F.K.50A
One built, twin tail, longer nose, bigger mainwheels, Higher all-up weight.
F.K.50B
Proposed Bomber variant, not built.

Operators

Swiss Alpar

Maryland Flying Services

Specifications (F.K.50)

References

Sources

 
 

FK.50
1930s Dutch airliners
Aircraft first flown in 1935
Twin piston-engined tractor aircraft
High-wing aircraft